Brent Edward Huffman (born September 4, 1979) is an American director, writer, and cinematographer of documentaries and television programs, including Saving Mes Aynak (2015). His work has been featured on Netflix, Discovery Channel, The National Geographic Channel, VICE, NBC, CNN, PBS, Time, The New York Times, Al Jazeera America and Al Jazeera English and premiered at International Documentary Film Festival Amsterdam (IDFA), and many other U.S. and international film festivals. He is also a professor at the Medill School of Journalism at Northwestern University where he teaches documentary production and theory.

Brent Huffman is a producer of Finding Yingying (2020), an MTV documentary film that premiered at SXSW in 2020 and won the Breakthrough Voice Jury Award. Finding Yingying was nominated for an Emmy in 2021 in the Best Investigative Documentary category.  The film is currently streaming on Paramount+.

Brent Huffman's Saving Mes Aynak (2015) has won over 30 major awards and has been broadcast on television in over 70 countries. It can currently be seen on Netflix, iTunes, Amazon, Google Play, and on Special Edition DVD with Icarus Films.

His new documentary, Strands of Resistance (2021), examining China's economic relationship with Pakistan, premiered on Vice and Vice News Tonight. A vignette of the documentary called Uyghurs Who Fled China Now Face Repression in Pakistan won a Rory Peck Award in the Best News Feature category at the British Film Institute in London in 2021.

Career 
Born in Spencer, Ohio, Brent E. Huffman studied filmmaking and worked closely with professors and documentary filmmaker Julia Reichert, Steve Bognar, and James Klein. As a student, Huffman worked as an editor on Bognar and Reichert's Emmy award-winning documentary A Lion in the House. The filmmakers also let Huffman use their camera and sound equipment while he worked as a student on a documentary about the Warren County, Ohio, prison.  This became his first documentary, Welcome to Warren: Guards and Inmates on Life in Prison, which won a special Award of Recognition by the Grand Jury of The Discovery Channel/American Film Institute's SILVERDOCS Documentary Film Festival in Washington DC.  Huffman graduated with summa cum laude honors from Antioch College, Yellow Springs, OH in 2002.

From 2003 to 2005, while pursuing a master's degree in journalism with an emphasis on documentary/television production from the Graduate School of Journalism at University of California, Berkeley, Huffman directed, produced, shot, and edited The Weight of the World (2005), about the growing popularity of weightlifting during the first presidential election in Afghanistan. This film was broadcast on PBS's Frontline/World and Current TV.  Huffman co-produced The Women's Kingdom (2006), a short documentary about the matriarchal society of Mosuo ethnic minority in China, with his wife Xiaoli Zhou. Featured on Frontline/World on PBS, The Women's Kingdom went on to win the 33rd Student Academy Awards. Huffman went on to live and work for a year and a half in China filming ethnographic documentaries in remote areas for the China Exploration and Research Society (CERS).

From 2006 to 2008, Huffman taught video production, technique and theory in visual journalism at the Brooks Institute in Santa Barbara, CA. Throughout his teaching stint, Huffman continued to create documentary films focusing on international topics pinned to China. The Colony (2010), exploring China's new economic role in Africa, aired on Al Jazeera. The film screened in the academic and research context as well, with Huffman invited by the U.S. Embassy in Dakar, Senegal, to lead a symposium about China's increasing presence in Senegal. With The Colony, Huffman gave lectures about China's role in Africa at USC's US/China Institute, Princeton University, and Columbia University. Before moving on as a professor at Medill School of Journalism at Northwestern University, Huffman covered Vortex 2, the world's largest tornado research project, for NBC Universal and The Weather Channel.

Saving Mes Aynak 

In 2007, China Metallurgical Group Corporation, a Chinese state-owned conglomerate, bid $3.4 billion for the rights to mine deposits near the village of Aynak. The New York Times reported: "Over the next 25 years, it plans to extract about 11 million tons of copper — an amount equal to one-third of all the known copper reserves in China."  Reading further reporting on the New York Times on the involvement of China and U.S. government in the mineral reserves in Afghanistan, Huffman began his research into this subject and began filming in Mes Aynak on his own in 2011. On top of the copper reserve in Mes Aynak, it turns out, is an archaeological excavation site, uncovering "thousands of Buddhist statues, manuscripts, coins, and holy monuments ... Entire monasteries and fortifications ... dating back as far as the third century", according to a National Geographic report. However, the site was surrounded by danger: during his stay, Huffman was never allowed to stay in the Mes Aynak area due to the threat of the Taliban. Huffman went through substantial scrutiny and restrictions from the Afghan and U.S. officials: every time he visited the site, he had to go through the permission process from the Ministry of Culture, Kabul Police, and the local province. The Afghanistan-U.S. embassy declined to be interviewed for the film and did not allow American archaeologists working in Mes Aynak to be interviewed for the film.

By 2012, Huffman's account of the struggles of archaeologists in Mes Aynak was published on CNN, an "Op-Doc" on The New York Times, NPR, the Tricycle Magazine, among others.  Huffman traveled around universities and museums around the U.S. showing his footage from Mes Aynak. The footage was also used by the Smithsonian Museum to educate members of the U.S. State Department about the situation at the ancient Buddhist archaeological site in Mes Aynak.  Huffman launched a Kickstarter campaign to help Afghan archeologists purchase digital cameras and computers for their facility and to help pay for the film's production costs. The campaign raised more than $35,000 and helped the story of Mes Aynak reach a huge international audience, which resulted in online and street protests against the mining of Mes Aynak.  With the donation from Kickstarter and a grant from MacArthur Foundation, Huffman finished the project, which became Saving Mes Aynak. In 2014, Saving Mes Aynak was invited by the President of Afghanistan, Ashraf Ghani, for a private screening.  Due to dangers of Taliban and opposition to the demolition of the archaeological excavation site, China Metallurgical Group Corp has delayed its mining operation in Mes Aynak.

In 2014, Kartemquin Films officially announced that it will be producing Saving Mes Aynak and the same year, the film had a world premiere at the International Documentary Film Festival Amsterdam (IDFA), the largest documentary film festival in the world. In 2015, Saving Mes Aynak was broadcast on Al Jazeera America and Al Jazeera English, broadcast and screened throughout over 20 countries.

As of 2016, Saving Mes Aynak continues to be shown widely in universities, museums, and film festivals across the U.S. and around the world. The main subject of the documentary Qadir Temori is now the director of the Afghan Institute of Culture, leading the effort with the Oriental Institute and the Afghanistan U.S. Embassy to create a satellite-based map database of Afghanistan's cultural heritage sites and train young Afghans in the field of archaeology.  The film remains free to watch for people in Afghanistan. In 2015,

In an interview with Audience Everywhere, Huffman announced that he is working on a new project on China's presence in Pakistan.

Awards and honors
 2022: Silver Telly Award in the Documentary Category.
 2021: Rory Peck Award for Best News Feature
2021: Emmy Nomination for Finding Yingying Best Investigative Documentary
2020: Chinese Academy Award for Finding Yingying
2016: Grand Prix & Prix du Public - XVth festival Icronos of Bordeaux, France
 2016: Grand Prix - AGON - the 10th International Meeting of Archaeological Film, Athens, Greece
 2016: Best Documentary Award - Life After Oil Film Festival, Sardinia, Italy
 2016: The 37th Telly Award and People's Choice Telly Award
 2016: Chicago International Film Festival, Silver Plaque for the Best Documentary in Art/Humanities category
 2016: Green Spark Award, American Conservation Film Festival
 2016: Reva and David Logan Foundation Grant for Saving Mes Aynak
 2015: Grand Prize and Audience Award for Saving Mes Aynak. Arkhaios Archaeology and Cultural Heritage Festival
 2015: Best Film One-Hour International Award for Saving Mes Aynak. CinemAmbiente International Environmental Film Festival. Turin, Italy
 2015: Honorary International Documentary Film Award 2015 from the International Academic Forum. Kobe, Japan
 2015: “Best Film” and “Best Educational Film” for Saving Mes Aynak at the International Archaeology Film Festival. Oregon
 2015: Abu Rayhan Biruni Award for Saving Mes Aynak. Ahvaz International Science Film Festival. Iran
 2014: MacArthur Foundation Grant of $100,000 for Saving Mes Aynak
 2014: Outstanding Alumni of the Year Award – Wright State University
 2012: Asia Society - Research Award.
 2012: Evanston Community Foundation - Research Grant
 2012: Buffett Institute for Global Studies, Northwestern University - Faculty Research Grant
 2011: Global Heritage Fund - Research Award
 2011: CINE Golden Eagle and Telly Award for The Colony
 2010: Best Documentary Award – Short Category for The Women's Kingdom. Fresno International Film Festival, Italy
 2007: Primetime Emmy for A Lion in the House – PBS Series
 2007: Conservation Award and Best Wildlife Film for Crime Scene Wild, Discovery Channel Series
 2006: International Documentary Association (IDA) Award Nomination for The Women's Kingdom
 2006: CINE Golden Eagle Award for The Women's Kingdom
 2005: Student Academy Award for The Women's Kingdom
 2005: National College Emmy by the Academy of Television Arts and Sciences for What If
 2005: CINE Golden Eagle Award for The Weight of the World
 2005: Bronze Award - Worldfest International Film Festival for The Weight of the World
 2004: Special Award of Recognition by the Grand Jury of The Discovery Channel/American Film Institute's SILVERDOCS Documentary Film Festival for Welcome to Warren: Guards and Inmates on Life in Prison
 2004: Knight Journalism Reporting Fellowship for The Weight of the World
 2004: University of California, Berkeley International Reporting Fellowship for The Weight of the World

Filmography 
 Saving Mes Aynak (2015)
 Syrian Refugees in Jordan (2012)
 Kiva in Liberia (2012)
 The Colony (2010)
 Sound Tracks: Music Without Borders (2010)
 The Women's Kingdom (2006)
 Shadows and Lies (2006)
 A Death in the Desert (2006)
 The Weight of the World (2005)
 Damming the Angry River (2005)
 East and West - Natural Heroes (2006)
 Built in Kabul (2005)
 Welcome to Warren (2004)
 What If? (TV Movie documentary) (2004)
Other credits:
 Finding Yingying (Documentary) (producer) (2020)
Utopia in Four Movements (Documentary) (camera operator) (2010)
 A Lion in the House (camera operator, editor) (2006)
 Finding Grace (additional camera operator) (2004)

References

External links 
 
 Brent E. Huffman's production company site - German Camera Productions
 Kartemquin Films

American documentary film directors
American documentary film producers
UC Berkeley Graduate School of Journalism alumni
Northwestern University faculty
Wright State University alumni
Brooks Institute faculty
1979 births
Living people
People from Medina County, Ohio
Film directors from Ohio
Film producers from Ohio